Merrimac is a small town in Essex County, Massachusetts, United States, and on the southeastern border of New Hampshire, approximately  northeast of Boston and  west of the Atlantic Ocean. It was incorporated on April 11, 1876. It is situated along the north bank of the Merrimack River in the Merrimack Valley.  The population was 6,723 at the 2020 census. Historically a mill town, it has long since become a largely residential community. It is part of the Greater Boston metropolitan area.

History

Settled by the English in 1638 as a part of Salisbury and later as a part of Amesbury around the village of Merrimacport, it was known throughout the seventeenth and eighteenth centuries as an agricultural and fishing community, with a small amount of shipbuilding. When Amesbury separated from Salisbury in 1666, Merrimac was referred to as the West Parish of Amesbury, or simply West Amesbury, although it was unincorporated. When a border dispute between the Massachusetts and New Hampshire colonies was settled in 1741, the new border sliced off the parts of Amesbury that were further from the Merrimack River, with the area then associated with West Amesbury becoming the "new town" of Newton, New Hampshire.

In 1771, the West Parish of Amesbury (present-day Merrimac) had a population of at least four enslaved Africans. They were held in bondage by town residents Isaac Merrill, Benjamin Morse, and Wells Chase. At least one former enslaved African, "Forte," who was sold by an unknown West Newbury slaver to Christopher Sargent, became locally famous for his fiddling after the abolition of slavery in Massachusetts.

In the nineteenth century, benefiting from a manufacturing boom following the establishment of some of the first planned industrial cities in the United States, nearby Lawrence and Lowell, Merrimac came to be known worldwide for its horse-drawn carriage industry. During this period, the town proper of Merrimac, centered around Merrimac Square, expanded separately from the village of Merrimacport. In 1876, Merrimac, including Merrimacport, separated from Amesbury and officially incorporated itself as a town. It is believed that the town, as well as the river that runs along its southern border, are both named for the American Indian tribe that occupied the region. "Merrimac" (or Merrimack) means "swift water place" in the language of this tribe. This town center consists of the typical brick buildings and Victorian architecture of the late nineteenth century, and it is surrounded by much of the town's population. Interstate 495 now divides Merrimacport from Merrimac. At the beginning of the twentieth century, as with the rest of the New England, it went through a period of deindustrialization as the region's industry relocated to the Midwest. The communities of the Merrimack Valley, including Merrimac, were particularly affected by this long period of economic decline and have never fully recovered.

Today, Merrimac is a typical small New England community. It went through numerous growth spurts throughout the 1990s and the beginning of the twenty-first century as it was absorbed into the Lawrence metropolitan area.

Geography
Merrimac is drained by the Merrimack River, whose north bank the town lies on. Located in the Merrimack River Valley and on the coastal plain of Massachusetts, Merrimac's land consists mainly of small, forested hills (before the twentieth century, it was mostly pasture). The town also has several ponds, streams and Lake Attitash (which is located partially in Merrimac, and partially in neighboring Amesbury).

Merrimac is roughly diamond-shaped, and is bordered by Amesbury and Lake Attitash to the northeast, West Newbury to the southeast, Haverhill to the southwest, Newton, New Hampshire, to the north and northwest, South Hampton, New Hampshire, to the far northeast, and Plaistow, New Hampshire, on the western corner. Merrimac lies along Interstate 495, with Exit 53 giving access to the town. Massachusetts Route 110 also passes through the town, just north of I-495. There are no bridges crossing the Merrimack directly into the town; the Rocks Village Bridge lies just to the south of town in Haverhill, and the nearest downstream crossing is the Whittier Memorial Bridge in Amesbury.

Demographics

As of the census of 2000, there were 6,138 people, 2,233 households, and 1,699 families residing in the town. The racial makeup of the town was 98.27% White, 0.39% African American, 0.11% Native American, 0.28% Asian, 0.29% from other races, and 0.65% from two or more races. Hispanic or Latino of any race were 0.90% of the population.

There were 2,233 households, out of which 40.6% had children under the age of 18 living with them, 62.8% were married couples living together, 10.3% had a female householder with no husband present, and 23.9% were non-families. 19.8% of all households were made up of individuals, and 9.2% had someone living alone who was 65 years of age or older.  The average household size was 2.73 and the average family size was 3.16.

In the town, the population was spread out, with 29.0% under the age of 18, 5.0% from 18 to 24, 31.4% from 25 to 44, 23.6% from 45 to 64, and 11.0% who were 65 years of age or older.  The median age was 37 years. For every 100 females, there were 94.9 males.  For every 100 females age 18 and over, there were 90.5 males.

The median income for a household in the town was $58,692, versus $65,401 statewide, and the median income for a family was $69,118. Males had a median income of $48,718 versus $35,325 for females. The per capita income for the town was $24,869. About 1.9% of families and 2.7% of the population were below the poverty line, including 0.7% of those under age 18 and 7.7% of those age 65 or over.

Government
Merrimac is governed by the New England town meeting form of government, a kind of participatory direct democracy. Three selectmen are elected to administer the government, but all major decisions, as well as many minor decisions, are handled during the town's annual town meeting, as well as special town meetings, if required. The board of selectman has three seats. The current chair of the board is Ben Beaulieu, Chris Manni is the clerk, and the other member is Joel Breen.

Per the constitution of the Commonwealth of Massachusetts, any resident of Merrimac may introduce legislation with the support of 10 registered voters.

Merrimac is part of the Massachusetts Senate's 1st Essex district.

Education
The following schools in the Pentucket Regional School District serve the town of Merrimac. All regional schools, however, are located in neighboring West Newbury. Merrimac High School operated until 1958, but closed when Pentucket Regional High School opened.

 Frederick N. Sweetsir School – named for a doctor who practiced in Merrimac
 Helen R. Donaghue School – named for a former principal of the school
 Pentucket Regional Middle School
 Pentucket Regional High School

For high school, students also have the option of attending the following vocational/agricultural schools.

 Whittier Regional Vocational Technical High School
 Essex Agricultural and Technical High School

Notable people

 Dennis Berran, outfielder for the Chicago White Sox
 Pat Freiermuth, Tight End for the NFL's Pittsburgh Steelers, drafted 55th overall in 2021
 Richard P. Gabriel, computer scientist known for his contributions to the Lisp programming language community
 Ephraim Morse, early settler of San Diego, California and one of the founders of Balboa Park
 Henry Boynton Smith, Presbyterian theologian
 Kevin J. Sullivan, Massachusetts politician and former mayor of Lawrence
 George W. Weymouth, Massachusetts politician and former U.S. Representative

Sites of interest
 Lake Attitash (and Indian Head Park)
 The Merrimac Public Library, which is part of the Merrimack Valley Library Consortium.
 Merrimac Square
 Merrimac Town Forest
 Merrimac Training Field
 Merrimacport

Annual events
Merrimac is home to several regional events:
 The Merrimac Santa Parade
 Merrimac Old Home Days

References

External links

 Town of Merrimac official website
 Merrimac Public Library
 1872 Map of Amesbury (Merrimac was then known as West Amesbury) from plate 9 of the 1872 Atlas of Essex County.
 1884 Map of Merrimac from plate 172 of the 1884 Atlas of Essex County.
 1884 Map of Merrimacport from plate 154 of the 1884 Atlas of Essex County.
 1884 Map of Merrimac Village from plate 151 of the 1884 Atlas of Essex county.
 1888 Merrimac article by William T. Davis on pages 1535–1556 in Volume II of the History of Essex County Massachusetts with Biographical Sketches, published by D. Hamilton Hurd in 1888.
  1922 Merrimac article Chapter 30 on pages 313–318  of Volume I of the Municipal History of Essex County, edited by Benjamin F. Arrington, published 1922 by Lewis Historical Publishing.

Towns in Essex County, Massachusetts
Towns in Massachusetts
Massachusetts populated places on the Merrimack River